Winsford railway station serves the town of Winsford in Cheshire, England on the West Coast Main Line),  north of .

History

The station was opened in 1837 on the Grand Junction Railway.

There have been two serious rail collisions near Winsford; the first in 1948 killed 24, the second in 1962 killed 18.

Facilities
Winsford station was upgraded in winter 2010. The upgrade included the installation of help points and electronic arrival/departure boards on the platforms as well as a departure monitor in the main building.  The ticket office is staffed from 07:00 to 12:00 on Mondays through Thursdays and 07:00 to 15:00 on Fridays and Saturdays (closed Sundays); outside these hours there is a ticket machine available, which can also be used to collect tickets purchased in advance.  Though the footbridge linking the platforms has stairs, step-free access is available to both via local roads.

Services
The station is managed by West Midlands Trains, branded as London Northwestern Railway, who provides services between Birmingham New Street and Liverpool Lime Street.  Trains call hourly in each direction throughout the week (except Sunday mornings), with a few extra calls at weekday peak times.

Notes

External links

Railway stations in Cheshire
DfT Category F1 stations
Former London and North Western Railway stations
Railway stations in Great Britain opened in 1837
Railway stations served by West Midlands Trains
Stations on the West Coast Main Line
Winsford